The Lorgnette, subtitled "Theatrical Journal and Programme" (later "A journal for Amusements"), was a weekly magazine in Melbourne, Australia, devoted to theatre, opera and the concert stage. The magazine was published Saturdays and sold for 2d (two pence) at the major entertainment venues (Theatre Royal, Opera House, Academy of Music, Princess' Theatre, St George's Hall and Town Hall) where it had exclusive rights, and elsewhere.

For much of its existence, a four-page supplement was issued with the Saturday two pence (from 1890 one penny) paper. The supplement was available gratis as a separate publication every other day of the week. This supplement was printed (and contents updated) daily, and datestamped.
 
In order to promote forthcoming productions as well as providing up-to-date theatre news and current programmes, a great deal of its content was reprinted from one issue to the next, perhaps a unique characteristic of this magazine, while some features changed with every issue, notably the illustrated biographies, a list of which forms a large part of this article.

History
A sheet called The Lorgnette made its first appearance in Melbourne in July 1865, "a local Punch" without pictures" and was hailed by The Argus for its "considerable spirit".

In April 1877, following a complaint from Joseph Alfred Hildreth, publisher of rival theatrical paper L'Entracte, John J. Liddy, publisher of "The Lorgnette" at Royal lane, off 106 Bourke Street east, was fined £5 with £2 2s. costs for having an unregistered press and types in his possession.

 
In 1878 William Marshall, of Melbourne's The Record and Emerald Hill and Sandridge Advertiser ("The Record") newspaper, with printing works at Emerald Hill, purchased The Lorgnette and its printery, and continued running both businesses. Marshall divested himself of The Record in 1881.

The printing works was adjacent the Bijou Theatre, Melbourne, which was destroyed by fire in April 1889. Marshall suffered significant losses as did the Brough-Boucicault Comedy Company, lessees of the theatre.
Members of the acting community put on a benefit performance for Marshall, which raised £582. Those involved included George Coppin, the Majeronis, J. C. Williamson, Richard Stewart, Grattan Riggs, Fred Maccabe, Alfred Dampier, Henry Harwood, and Bland Holt.

A feature of issues from 11 May 1889 to 6 December 1890 was a biography of a prominent artist, accompanied by a photo-engraved (perhaps leggotype) portrait, a list of which appears below.

In January 1889 Marshall purchased Fred E. Patey's interest in the Theatrical Courier and henceforth the Lorgnette was subtitled "With which is incorporated The Theatrical Courier".

11 May 1889 saw the first of the weekly series of biographies which continued to December 1890.

17 January 1891 was the last (Saturday) weekly issue at 1d. It was followed with an issue labelled "4th Series No. 1" dated 18 January, and was supplied gratis. It appears that, as with the Supplements mentioned above, fresh issues with updates could have been printed every day.

John Liddy, who maintained a personal (if not financial) interest in the paper, died in January 1891

In 1898 William Marshall & Co. moved from Royal Lane to new premises at 229 Little Collins Street (just above Swanston Street. The old premises had been condemned as unfit in 1895 and again in 1896. Marshall died on 12 June 1900, aged 55, fondly remembered by the theatre community.

The Lorgnette biographies

Digitization 
Photographic copies of The Lorgnette from 1 July 1878 to 1 December 1898 have been digitized by the National library of Australia and may be accessed via Trove. In the "4th Series" a representative issue from the first of each month has been digitized.

References 

Arts magazines published in Australia
1875 establishments in Australia
1895 disestablishments in Australia
Magazines established in 1875
Magazines disestablished in 1895
Magazines published in Melbourne
Weekly magazines published in Australia
Defunct magazines published in Australia